EA Cricket is a series of cricket video games published by EA Sports and designed for the Microsoft Windows, PlayStation and PlayStation 2 platforms. Until now, eight different games of the series have been released, between 1996 and 2007.

Games

Cricket 96

Cricket 96 is a cricket game for the MS-DOS PCs that was released in 1995. The sequel to Super International Cricket on the SNES, it was developed by Beam Software and published by EA Sports. It was released as Ian Botham's International Cricket 96 in Europe.

Despite featuring improved graphics, like its predecessors the game continued to forgo official team and player licensing, although many of the in-game players had recognizable real-life counterparts.

Cricket 97

ICC Cricket World Cup England 99
This game was developed by Creative Assembly and released only for the PC.

Cricket 2000

Cricket 2002

Cricket 2002 is a 2001 video game based on the sport of cricket by EA Sports. It was released for the PlayStation 2  and Microsoft Windows.

Cricket 2004

Cricket 2004 is a 2003 video game based on the sport of cricket by EA Sports. The game was designed by HB Studios, known for their EA Rugby Series. It was released for the PlayStation 2 and Microsoft Windows.

Cricket 2004 features all of the international teams that played in the 2003 Cricket World Cup, all of the domestic teams of Australia and England.

The player can create their own players for Cricket 2004 and choose which team they play for.  An Autoplay feature allows the player to skip 5, 10, 15, 20, 50 or 100 (4 and 5 day games only) overs, until a wicket falls, or to the end of the innings.

The graphics were awarded "Worst PlayStation 2 graphics" by IGN.

Cricket 2005

Cricket 2005 is a video game based on the sport of cricket. Developed by EA Canada and HB Studios and released by EA Sports, it was released in July 2005 on Xbox, PlayStation 2 and Windows.

The game was released in three different region-based covers. Adam Gilchrist appeared on the Australian cover, Daniel Vettori on the New Zealand cover and Andrew Flintoff on the English cover. It was the last game to have all real player names.

Cricket 07

References

External links
 

{{DEFAULTSORT:[https:  www.globalinfo4.com 2022 09 the-greatest-cricket-players-of-all-time.html Sports Cricket (Series])}}
1996 video games
EA Sports games
Cricket
Cricket video games
DOS games
PlayStation 2 games
Video game franchises
Video games developed in Canada
Video games developed in Australia
Windows games
Xbox games